Novogladovka is a rural locality (a selo) in Bolshezadoyevsky Selsoviet, Kizlyarsky District, Republic of Dagestan, Russia. The population was 413 as of 2010. There are 5 streets.

Geography 
Novogladovka is located 17 km east of Kizlyar (the district's administrative centre) by road, on the left bank of the Stary Terk River. Mulla-Ali and Malaya Zadovka are the nearest rural localities.

Nationalities 
Avars live there.

References 

Rural localities in Kizlyarsky District